The Louisiana–Monroe Warhawks football program is a college football team that represents the University of Louisiana at Monroe (ULM) in the NCAA's Sun Belt Conference. The Warhawks have played 758 games during 69 seasons of senior college football. ULM has had 15 head coaches since its first season of senior college football in 1951 at what was then known as Northeast Louisiana State College with the nickname Indians. 

Pat Collins is the program's all-time leader in games coached (92), years coached (8), and wins (57) while leading the Indians to two Southland Conference championships and one national championship in what is now the Football Championship Subdivision. Only two other head coaches, Dave Roberts and Charlie Weatherbie, have led the program to conference titles. Roberts remains the team's all-time leader in winning percentage (.661). In terms of winning percentage, the least successful coach in program history was Bobby Keasler, with a record of 8-28 (.222) over four seasons. Todd Berry is the only coach to lead the Warhawks to a winning season and a postseason bowl in the Football Bowl Subdivision. In 2012, Berry's Warhawks finished the season 8–5 and were invited to the Independence Bowl, where they were defeated by Ohio.

Only one coach in program history has been inducted into the College Football Hall of Fame. John David Crow, who was an All-American halfback and Heisman Award winner at Texas A&M University, was inducted as a player in 1976. No ULM coach has received National Coach of the Year honors.

The current coach is Terry Bowden, who was hired in December 2020.

Key

Coaches

Notes

References
General

Specific

Louisiana-Monroe Warhawks

Louisiana sports-related lists